KSDW (88.9 FM) is a Christian radio station licensed to Temecula, California and serving the Temecula Valley and San Diego County.  The station is owned and operated by Calvary Chapel Costa Mesa, and studios are co-located in Santa Ana with sister station KWVE-FM.

KSDW's format consists mainly of contemporary worship music but also features Bible teaching programs of churches in the Temecula Valley, greater San Diego, and throughout the nation.

External links

SDW
Temecula, California
Mass media in San Diego County, California
Radio stations established in 1979
1979 establishments in California